The second series of the British television drama series Ackley Bridge began broadcasting on 5 June 2018 June 2018 on Channel 4, and ended on 21 August 2018. The series follows the lives of the staff and pupils at the fictional multi-cultural academy school Ackley Bridge College, in the fictitious Yorkshire mill town of Ackley Bridge. It consists of twelve sixty-minute episodes.

Production and casting
Production and filming on the series began in January 2018 in Halifax, West Yorkshire. Filming also occurred in Bradford, West Yorkshire. In January 2018, the show's production company, The Forge, put out an open casting call for teenagers and adults to act as extras in the series.

Former Girls Aloud singer Kimberley Walsh was cast as Steve Bell's (Paul Nicholls) ex-girlfriend, Claire Butterworth, who is the mother to their child, Zac. Walsh said she enjoyed working with Jo Joyner and Nicholls, calling her role "fun" and the show "fantastic [...] with a brilliant cast." Walsh stated that her role in the series is "quite different" to other roles she has portrayed, describing Claire as "sassy and strong" as she is determined "to get her claws back into Steve." Vicky Entwistle, who played Janice Battersby on Coronation Street, appears as Iqbal Paracha's (Narinda Samra) secret wife Sandra Turner and mother of Iqbal's children. Entwistle commented that she was "thrilled to be joining the very talented cast of Ackley Bridge and look forward to watching how everything unfolds" and she "had a great time filming with a wonderful bunch of people." Lin Blakley and Ted Robbins join the show as Mandy's parents, "abusive" Ray, who is suffering from dementia, and Dianne, who "can't cope" with Ray.

Cast

Main

Recurring

Guest

Episodes

References

2018 British television seasons
Series 2